Mirabad (also Romanized as Mīrābād) is a village in Chahriq Rural District, Kuhsar District, Salmas County, West Azerbaijan Province, Iran. At the 2006 census, its population was 104, in 24 families.

References 

Populated places in Salmas County